La casa stregata is a 1982 Italian comedy film directed by Bruno Corbucci and starring Renato Pozzetto and Gloria Guida.

Plot
In a mythical "Arabian Nights" prologue two crossed lovers are struck by a curse cast unto them by a powerful witch (Lia Zoppelli) who had betrothed her own daughter, Candida, (Gloria Guida) to the evil tyrant Ali Amman, while the girl was passionately in love with "Giorgiafat" (Renato Pozzetto); the witch turns the two lovers into salt statues forcing their disembodied souls to wander for a thousand years before re-incarnating and meeting again.

If they would be able to prolong Candida's virginity until the thousandth anniversary of the curse expires, they will be able to live happily, if not the curse would renew itself.

A thousand years later Giorgio is a young Italian bank clerk who has to move from Milan to Rome for work reasons, promising his girlfriend Candida to find a suitable abode for them and her own mother (again, Lia Zoppelli). After many comical incidents Giorgio finds a luxurious mansion for rent at a ludicrously low price and is soon joined by Candida and her mother.

The couple is soon married, but a series of supernatural incidents prevents them from consummating; the poltergeist activity seems centered around Giorgio's pet dog (a Great Dane who starts talking in a heavy southern accent) and a mysterious character who looks like the faithful servant of "Giorgiafat".

Cast 
Renato Pozzetto as Giorgio Allegri
Gloria Guida as Candida Melengo
Yorgo Voyagis as  Oscar
Lia Zoppelli as  Anastasia, Candida's Mother
 Angelo Pellegrino as  Elpidio  
 Leo Gavero as  The Bank Manager
Franco Diogene as The Realtor
 Vittorio Ripamonti as  Don Alvino
 Nicola Morelli as  Albani 
Bruno Corbucci as The Vet (uncredited)
 Marilda Donà as  Lucia

Production
La casa stregata was shot on location in Milan, Rome and at Villa Giovanelli-Fogaccia and DePaolis In.Ci.R. Studios. Among the cast was Gloria Guida, in which this was among her last films he appeared in.

Release
La casa stregata was distributed theatrically by Cineriz on March 4, 1982 in Italy.

Reception
From contemporary reviews, Aldo Vigano of La Stampa criticized Corbucci's direction and found the film to be similar to Giorgio Capitani's film Bollenti spiriti released the previous year. Leonardo Autera of Corriere della Sera complained about the profanity, finding it "repetitive to the point of boredom."

See also
 List of Italian films of 1982

References

Footnotes

Sources

External links

1982 comedy films
1982 films
Films directed by Bruno Corbucci
Films scored by Detto Mariano
Italian comedy films
Films shot in Milan
Films shot in Rome
1980s Italian films